Veyka Point (‘Nos Veyka’ \'nos 'vey-ka\) is the ice-free tipped point on the east side of the entrance to Lesura Cove forming the south extremity of Two Hummock Island in the Palmer Archipelago, Antarctica.  The minor Cobălcescu Island is lying 1.2 km east-southeast of the point.

The point is named after Veyka Peak in the Rhodope Mountains, Bulgaria.

Location
British mapping in 1978.

Maps
 British Antarctic Territory.  Scale 1:200000 topographic map.  DOS 610 Series, Sheet W 64 60.  Directorate of Overseas Surveys, UK, 1978.
 Antarctic Digital Database (ADD). Scale 1:250000 topographic map of Antarctica. Scientific Committee on Antarctic Research (SCAR), 1993–2016.

References
 Bulgarian Antarctic Gazetteer. Antarctic Place-names Commission. (details in Bulgarian, basic data in English)
 Veyka Point. SCAR Composite Antarctic Gazetteer.

External links
 Veyka Point. Copernix satellite image

Headlands of the Palmer Archipelago
Bulgaria and the Antarctic
Two Hummock Island